Pollari is a Finnish and Italian surname. It may refer to:

Joey Pollari (born 1994), American actor
Zachary Pollari (born 1986), Canadian footballer
Pat Pollari, pseudonym of K. A. Applegate (born 1956), American author
Nicolò Pollari (born 1943), Italian general